Kajikawa is a Japanese surname. Notable people with the surname include:

Bill Kajikawa (1912–2010), American basketball coach
, Japanese archer
, Japanese footballer
, Japanese swimmer
, Japanese golfer
, Japanese samurai

Japanese-language surnames